The cessative aspect or terminative aspect is a grammatical aspect referring to the end of an action or a state. It is the opposite of the inchoative aspect and conveys the idea of "to stop doing something" or "to finish doing something".

In Yaqui, the cessative is formed with the suffix -yaáte. For example, "ču'ú 'íntok čái-yaáte-k", "the dog stopped barking".

In Timbisha, the cessative is formed with the suffix -mmahwan. For example, "satü püe nangkawimmahwa", "he just finished talking".

References

Grammatical aspects